The following is a list of Australian television ratings for the year 1996.

Network Shares 

* Data Gathered by then Ratings Supplier: A.C Neilsen Australia

Most Watched Broadcasts in 1996

Top Rating Regular Programmes

Weeknight News and Current Affairs Readers 1996
REDIRECT List of Australian TV Newsreaders

See also

Television ratings in Australia

References

1996
1996 in Australian television